Max Leognany (12 March 1913 – 11 February 1994) was a French artist.

He grew up in Yport-sur-Mer, and as a young man entered the École des Beaux-Arts (School of Fine Arts).

He studied continuously during the Second World War and received training in a jeweller's workshop. He then specialised in engraving coins and medals, and in 1945 he was awarded the Prix de Rome in the Engraving category. He concentrated mainly on medals, but produced some sculptures, as well as 40 ceremonial swords for members of the French Academy, including the sword of Léopold Sédar Senghor. He did work on both French and foreign decorations, of which the National Order of Merit (Ordre national du mérite) was one.  He was himself a Knight of the Legion of Honour.

References 

1913 births
1994 deaths
People from Mirecourt
20th-century French engravers
French medallists
20th-century French painters
20th-century French male artists
French male painters
Prix de Rome for engraving
Chevaliers of the Légion d'honneur
20th-century French sculptors
French male sculptors
20th-century French printmakers